In the Arms of a Killer is a 1992 American television film written and directed by Ronald A. Levinson.

Plot 
Maria Quinn (Smith) has only recently begun working as a detective in Manhattan, but is already assigned to investigate a horrendous murder, involving a drug lord who was shot with an overdose of heroin at a party. The case takes a personal turn when she finds out that the prime suspect is her lover.

Cast
Jaclyn Smith as Maria Quinn
John Spencer as Det. Vincent Cusack
Nina Foch as Mrs. Venible
Gerald S. O'Loughlin as Art Seidensticker
Sandahl Bergman as Nurse Henninger
Linda Dona as Chrissy
Alan Blumenfeld
Robert Miranda
Kristoffer Tabori as Dennis
Michael Nouri as Brian Venible

References

External links

1992 films
1992 television films
1990s crime drama films
American crime drama films
Films scored by Lee Holdridge
Films about murder
Films set in New York City
NBC network original films
1992 drama films
Films directed by Robert L. Collins
American drama television films
1990s English-language films
1990s American films